Below is a list of covered bridges in Madison County, Iowa.  
There are only six extant bridges in Madison County.  
Cedar Covered Bridge
Cutler–Donahoe Bridge
Hogback Covered Bridge
Holliwell Covered Bridge
Imes Bridge
Roseman Covered Bridge

Gallery

See also
List of bridges documented by the Historic American Engineering Record in Iowa
List of covered bridges in Iowa
The Bridges of Madison County 1992 novel, adapted as a 1995 film and a 2014 stage musical

Covered Bridges
Iowa, Madison County Covered Bridges

Madison County Covered Bridges
Madison County Covered Bridges
Tourist attractions in Madison County, Iowa
Bridges, covered in Madison County